Alvin Avinesh is a Fijian footballer who plays as a midfielder.

International career

International goals
Scores and results list Fiji's goal tally first.

References 

Living people
1982 births
Fijian footballers
Fiji international footballers
Fijian people of Indian descent
Labasa F.C. players
Lautoka F.C. players
Association football midfielders
2004 OFC Nations Cup players
2012 OFC Nations Cup players